These are the results for the 2005 edition of the Tour de Romandie race, in which Colombian Santiago Botero returned to his winning ways after two bad years in .

Stages

26-04-2005: Genève, 3.4 km. (ITT)

27-04-2005: Avenches, 166.9 km.

28-04-2005: Fleurier, 171.9 km.

29-04-2005: Aigle-Anzière. 146.5 km.

30-04-2005: Châtel Saint Denis-Les Paccots, 146.9 km.

01-05-2005: Lausanne, 20.4 km. (ITT)

General Standings

KOM Classification

Points Classification

Best Team

2005
Tour de Romandie
Tour de Romandie